Haimen Power Station is a large coal-fired power station in China.

See also 

 List of coal power stations
List of major power stations in Guangdong

External links 

 Haimen Power Station on Global Energy Monitor

References 

Coal-fired power stations in China